Maria Magdalena Matthey Correa, known professionally as Magdalena Matthey (born September 28, 1971, Santiago), is a Chilean singer-songwriter. She works in various genres including folk, popular music, Latin fusion, ballad, jazz and religious music. She has performed with Congreso, Inti Illimani, Ángel Parra, Eduardo Gatti, Pedro Aznar, Alejandro Filio, Ana María Bobonne. In 2000 she turned into the last Chilean contestant in the OTI Festival with the song "Tu naturaleza" (Your nature). Later, she was a participant in Viña del Mar International Song Festival.

Discography
Latidos del alma -	1997
Del otro lado - 	1999
Mañana será otro día - 	2004
Afuera - 	2007
Rumbos - 	2009

References

External links
 Official website
 

1971 births
Living people
People from Santiago
21st-century Chilean women singers
Chilean songwriters
Chile in the OTI Festival
20th-century Chilean women singers